The Yamaha T135 is an underbone manufactured by Yamaha Motor Company since 2005. It is known as the Spark 135/135i in Thailand, Sniper/MX 135 in the Philippines, Jupiter MX 135 LC in Indonesia, 135LC in Malaysia, Exciter 135 in Vietnam, and Crypton X 135 in Greece. It is powered by a  single-cylinder engine.

The bike is succeeded by the 150 cc T-150 elsewhere except Malaysia, where both models are sold.

Model history

2005 
The T135 debuted in 2005 for the Thailand and Indonesian markets, and then the Malaysian market in February 2006.  The model was very successful in Southeast Asia especially in Thailand.

To promote the T135, Yamaha organized a  road tour of ASEAN countries in November 2005 through May 2006, passing through Thailand, Malaysia, Singapore, and the Philippines.

2008 
In 2008, the fuel injected version of the T135 was launched for the Thailand market (dubbed as Spark 135i), making it the second underbone motorcycle using fuel injection after the Honda's Wave 125i.  There are 3 main Yamaha factories that assembled the T135. These are Indonesia, Thailand and newest is Philippines.

2011 
In 2011, the T135 was facelifted with a new body design. The transmission of the Malaysia's and Indonesia's manual clutch variant was revised to 5-speed transmission from the previous 4-speed as an upgrade. Hong Leong Yamaha Malaysia produced a cut-off from the CDI which limits the motorcycle's performance for the facelifted version.

2016 
In 2016, the manual clutch variant of the T135 was discontinued, as the T-150 made its debut. The automatic clutch variant is still sold.

2019 
In September 2019 the YAMAHA 135LC SE was introduced, the real successor of the Spark 135 series. Although in many countries the Exciter/ Jupiter 150-155cc is seen as the successor this is virtual an other model. The engine and all main components are the same as previous models. A better secured keylock and new bodywork and dashboard are the main changes.

2022 
The 2022 model received a redesign influenced by the larger T-150 and some other major upgrades such as new digital speedometer interface, larger basket with USB port, bigger fuel tank (4.6L) and rear brake no longer uses drum-brake system and is replaced with disc brake system instead.

References 

T135
T135
Motorcycles introduced in 2005 2017 v5 had been released. 2018 v5.2